The Lost Apothecary is a New York Times bestseller debut book written by Sarah Penner.

Fox Broadcasting Company is developing a television adaptation of the novel.

Plot 

Hidden in the depths of eighteenth-century London, a secret apothecary shop caters to an unusual kind of clientele. Women across the city whisper of a mysterious figure named Nella who sells well-disguised poisons to use against the oppressive men in their lives. But the apothecary’s fate is jeopardized when her newest patron, a precocious twelve-year-old, makes a fatal mistake, sparking a string of consequences that echo through the centuries.

Meanwhile in present-day London, aspiring historian Caroline Parcewell spends her tenth wedding anniversary alone, running from her own demons. When she stumbles upon a clue to the unsolved apothecary murders that haunted London two hundred years ago, her life collides with the apothecary’s in a stunning twist of fate—and not everyone will survive.

Reception 
The Lost Apothecary is a New York Times best seller.

Before publication, the book was named one of the most anticipated books of the year by CNN, HELLO!, Newsweek, and O, The Oprah Magazine.

Following publication, the book received positive reviews from NPR, Booklist, and Library Journal, as well as a mixed review from Publishers Weekly. Reader's Digest, Good Housekeeping, and Cosmopolitan included it in their lists of best books of the year.

In late 2021, it was nominated for a Goodreads Choice Award for Historical Fiction and for Debut Novel.

Adaptation 
The novel will be adapted into a television drama series by Fox Broadcasting Company.

References 

2021 British novels
English novels
2021 debut novels
Novels set in the 1800s
Novels set in the 19th century
Novels set in London
Fiction set in 1791